The Kodiang railway station is a Malaysian railway station located at and named after the town of Kodiang, Kubang Pasu, Kedah, Malaysia. It is served by the KTM Komuter Northern Sector Route No. 2.

Location and locality 
This station is located near to the town of Kodiang, not far from Perlis-Kedah state border. It is also near to Changlun and is closest station to Kedah border towns with Thailand like Sintok and Bukit Kayu Hitam. 

The station is also closest to many education institutes around the district such as Kedah Matriculation College and Kubang Pasu Science School.

Kubang Pasu District
Railway stations in Kedah
Railway stations opened in 2015